Mengjin District is a district in Luoyang City, in the northwest of Henan province, China, located to the north of Luoyang's urban districts.

History
Mengjin began its life as an ancient ferry crossing for the Yellow River. The ferry crossing was an important strategic location during times of war.

In Chapter 6 of Romance of the Three Kingdoms, Cao Cao explains that part of his strategy in engaging Dong Zhuo's forces was for Yuan Shao's forces to take control of Mengjin (see: Battle of Xingyang).

As of 2012, Mengjin is divided to 10 towns.
Towns

Climate

See also
Battle of Muye

References

County-level divisions of Henan
Districts of Luoyang